LP5 may refer to:

Albums
 LP5 (Autechre album), a 1998 album by Autechre
 "LP5" (Massive Attack album), the working title for a 2010 album by Massive Attack that was later released as Heligoland
 LP5 (Coldplay album), the working title for a 2011 album by Coldplay that was later released as Mylo Xyloto
 LP5 (Apparat album), a 2019 album by Apparat
 LP5 DLX (Asking Alexandria album), a 2019 rerelease of the 2017 album Asking Alexandria (album) by Asking Alexandria
 LP5 (John Moreland album), a 2020 album by John Moreland

Other uses
 LP5, a document for forming limited partnerships in England and Wales

See also

 
 LPV (disambiguation)